RozoFS is a free software distributed file system.  It comes as a free software, licensed under the GNU GPL v2. RozoFS uses erasure coding for redundancy.

Design 
Rozo provides an open source POSIX filesystem, built on top of distributed file system architecture similar to Google File System, Lustre or Ceph. The Rozo specificity lies in the way data is stored. The data to be stored is translated into several chunks using Mojette Transform and distributed across storage devices in such a way that it can be retrieved even if several pieces are unavailable. On the other hand, chunks are meaningless alone. Redundancy schemes based on coding techniques like the one used by RozoFS allow to achieve significant storage savings as compared to simple replication.

The file system comprises three components:

 Exports server — (Meta Data Server) manages the location (layout) of chunks (managing capacity load balancing with respect to high availability), file access and namespace (hierarchy). Multiple replicated metadata servers are used to provide failover. The Exports server is a user-space daemon; the metadata are stored synchronously to a usual file system (the underlying file system must support extended attributes).
 Storage servers — (Chunk Server) store the chunks. The Chunk server is also a user-space daemon that relies on the underlying local file system to manage the actual storage.
 Clients — talk to both the exports server and chunk servers and are responsible for data transformation. Clients mount the file system into user-space via FUSE.

See also 

 MapR FS
 Mojette Transform
 Distributed file system
 List of file systems, the distributed parallel fault-tolerant file system section
 GlusterFS
 Ceph
 BeeGFS
 MooseFS

References

Press articles 
 Storage Insider "Innovative Ansätze hauchen Scale-out NAS neues Leben ein" article July 2016
 Storage Insider "Storage-Startups: Die nächste Welle rollt" article July 2016
 CDP Blog "A new iteration to make Erasure Coding universal" article May 2016
 Storage Newsletter "MemoScale With New Iteration to Make Erasure Coding Universal" article May 2016
 The Register "Could Rozo squeeze into the scale-out NAS-object scalability gap?" article Dec. 2015
 Le Monde Informatique "Rozo passe à l'erasure coding 128 bits pour la v2 de son NAS distribué" article Dec. 2015
 Le Mag IT (TechTarget) "Rozo Systems dévoile la version 2.0 de sa technologie NAS distribuée" article Dec. 2015
 Storage Newsletter "V2.0 of RozoFS Scale-Out NAS Software" article Dec. 2015
 Silicon.fr "OpenIO, Outpace.io et Rozo: le stockage made in France s’exporte aux US" article Dec. 2015 
 The Register "Big Blue boosts Spectrum Scale, polishes the parallel file systems" article Dec. 2015
 ChannelNews "OpenIO et Rozo Systems, les deux pépites françaises du SDS" article Nov. 2015
 The Register "French upstart Rozo: Magic beans will help us become storage giant" article Oct. 2015
 Storage Newsletter "Start-Up Profile: Rozo Systems in Software-Defined Scale-Out NAS" article Oct. 2015
 Le Monde Informatique "La start-up française Rozo Systems recrute dans la Silicon Valley" article Oct. 2015

External links
 RozoFS official website
 RozoFS project on GitHub
 RozoFS blog

Distributed file systems
Network file systems
Userspace file systems
Distributed data storage